Hell is an unincorporated community in Livingston County in the U.S. state of Michigan. As an unincorporated community, Hell has no defined boundaries or population statistics of its own. The community is served by the Pinckney post office with the 48169 ZIP Code.

History
Hell developed around a sawmill, gristmill, distillery and tavern. All four were operated by George Reeves, who moved to the area in the 1830s from the Catskill Mountains in New York. He purchased a sawmill on what is now known as Hell Creek in 1841. In addition to the sawmill, Reeves purchased  of land surrounding the mill. Reeves then built a gristmill on Hell Creek which was powered by water that was impounded by a small dam across the creek. Farmers in the area were quite successful in growing wheat and had an abundance of grain. Reeves opened a distillery to process the excess grain into whiskey. Reeves also opened a general store/tavern on his property.

The tavern and distillery soon became a thriving business for Reeves. He built a ballroom on the second floor of the establishment and a sulky racetrack around his millpond. Reeves also sold his alcohol to nearby roadhouses and stores for as little as ten cents a gallon. His operation came under the scrutiny of the U.S. government in the years after the American Civil War. When tax collectors came to Hell to assess his operation, Reeves and his customers conspired to hide the whiskey by filling barrels and sinking them to the bottom of the millpond. When the government agents left the area, the barrels were hauled to the surface with ropes. As Reeves aged, he slowed his business ventures, closing the distillery and witnessing the burning of the gristmill. He died in 1877.

Reeves' family sold the land to a group of investors from Detroit in 1924. The investors increased the size of the millpond by raising the level of the dam, creating what is now Hiland Lake. The area soon became a summer resort area, attracting visitors for swimming and fishing. Henry Ford considered building some manufacturing facilities in the area but decided against it.

Etymology
Hell has been noted on a list of unusual place names. There are a number of theories for the origin of Hell's name. The first is that a pair of German travelers stepped out of a stagecoach one sunny afternoon in the 1830s, and one said to the other, "So schön hell!" (translated as, "So beautifully bright!") Their comments were overheard by some locals and the name stuck. The second theory is tied to the "hell-like" conditions encountered by early explorers including mosquitos, thick forest cover, and extensive wetlands. The third is that George’s habit of paying the local farmers for their grain with home distilled whiskey led many wives to comment “He’s gone to Hell again” when questioned about their husband’s whereabouts during harvest time. A fourth is that soon after Michigan gained statehood, George Reeves was asked what he thought the town he helped settle should be called and replied "I don't care. You can name it Hell for all I care." The name became official on October 13, 1841.

Arts and culture
In the early 1930s, Pinckney, Michigan, postmaster W. C. Miller began to receive requests from stamp and postmark collectors for cancellations: Hell had no post office, instead being served by the one for Pinckney, three miles away. On July 15, 1961, a postal substation was established at Hell, operating from May 1 through September 30. It remains at the back of the general store, although the United States Postal Service does not recognize Hell as a town; it instead uses the name of nearby Pinckney as the mailing address.

In 1963, the Hell Chamber of Commerce sponsored a two-day "fun festival" which began with Satan's arrival by helicopter at "Satan's Hills", a local housing development.

The town occasionally experiences sub-zero temperatures (including in Jan 2014, Jan 2018, and Jan 2019), leading to comparisons with the phrase when hell freezes over.

References

External links

 h2g2 guide to Hell, Michigan
 History of Hell, Michigan
 

1830s establishments in Michigan
Populated places established in the 1830s
Portages in the United States
Unincorporated communities in Livingston County, Michigan
Unincorporated communities in Michigan